Coromandel, also called Coromandel Town to distinguish it from the wider district, is a town on the Coromandel Harbour, on the western side of the Coromandel Peninsula, which is in the North Island of New Zealand. It is 75 kilometres east of the city of Auckland, although the road between them, which winds around the Firth of Thames and Hauraki Gulf coasts, is 190 km long.

The town was named after HMS Coromandel, which sailed into the harbour in 1820. At one time Coromandel Harbour was a major port serving the region's gold mining and kauri industries.  Today, the town's main industries are tourism and mussel farming.

Coromandel Harbour is a wide bay on the Hauraki Gulf guarded by several islands, the largest of which is Whanganui Island. The town and environs are a popular summer holiday destination for New Zealanders. Coromandel Town is noted for its artists, crafts, alternative lifestylers, mussel farming, and recreational fishing. One of the most popular tourist attractions is the Driving Creek Railway.

Modern history

The original Government plan for the town of Coromandel was for it to be built on Whanganui Island. Plans were drawn up and sections were sold but the plan was unsuccessful, in part because the land was too steep and there was no suitable fresh water source. Most of the sections were abandoned and purchased by the Government. The town was then established where it is today.

Demographics

Coromandel had a population of 1,743 at the 2018 New Zealand census, an increase of 225 people (14.8%) since the 2013 census, and an increase of 249 people (16.7%) since the 2006 census. There were 720 households, comprising 852 males and 891 females, giving a sex ratio of 0.96 males per female. The median age was 52.5 years (compared with 37.4 years nationally), with 258 people (14.8%) aged under 15 years, 243 (13.9%) aged 15 to 29, 732 (42.0%) aged 30 to 64, and 510 (29.3%) aged 65 or older.

Ethnicities were 83.1% European/Pākehā, 29.9% Māori, 2.2% Pacific peoples, 3.3% Asian, and 1.0% other ethnicities. People may identify with more than one ethnicity.

The percentage of people born overseas was 16.0, compared with 27.1% nationally.

Although some people chose not to answer the census's question about religious affiliation, 59.2% had no religion, 26.0% were Christian, 3.1% had Māori religious beliefs, 0.3% were Hindu, 0.3% were Muslim, 1.5% were Buddhist and 2.4% had other religions.

Of those at least 15 years old, 192 (12.9%) people had a bachelor's or higher degree, and 360 (24.2%) people had no formal qualifications. The median income was $23,500, compared with $31,800 nationally. 132 people (8.9%) earned over $70,000 compared to 17.2% nationally. The employment status of those at least 15 was that 555 (37.4%) people were employed full-time, 249 (16.8%) were part-time, and 39 (2.6%) were unemployed.

Education

Coromandel Rudolf Steiner School was a small private full primary (years 1–8) school. It closed at the end of 2007.

Marae

The local Manaia Marae and Te Kou o Rehua meeting house, are a meeting ground for the Ngāti Pūkenga iwi, and its Ngāti Maru hapū.

In October 2020, the Government committed $276,216 from the Provincial Growth Fund to upgrade the marae, creating an estimated 8 jobs.

The Old Coromandel Hospital is a meeting place for Te Patukirikiri iwi.

References

External links
 

Thames-Coromandel District
Populated places in Waikato
Populated places around the Hauraki Gulf / Tīkapa Moana